Cochylis epilinana is a species of moth of the family Tortricidae. It is found in most of Europe, Asia Minor, Israel and northern Syria.

The wingspan is 13–15 mm. Adults are on wing from May to August.

The larvae feed on Linum usitatissimum, Linum catharticum, Linum campanullatum, Solidago and Cephalaria leucantha.

References

Moths described in 1842
Cochylis